The Sazmartinshorn (2,827 m) is a mountain of the Glarus Alps, overlooking St. Martin and the lake of Gigerwald in the canton of St. Gallen. It lies on the range east of Piz Sardona, that separates the Weisstannental from the Calfeisental.
After the Pizol, the Sazmartinshorn is the second highest mountain lying entirely within the canton of St. Gallen.

References

External links
Sazmartinshorn on Hikr

Mountains of the Alps
Mountains of Switzerland
Mountains of the canton of St. Gallen